This is a full discography of albums and singles released by Motown singer Mary Wells during a 30-year career that spanned a repertoire of doo-wop, R&B, pop, soul, disco and dance. Throughout her career, she released a total of sixteen albums and twenty-seven singles that charted between 1960 and 1982. Among the singles, twelve of them reached the Top 40 with four reaching the top ten and one hitting number-one. On the R&B charts, eighteen in total reached the top 40, thirteen reached the top ten and three reached the number-one spot.

Albums

Singles

Motown (1960–1964)
All songs were released under the Motown label.

20th Century Fox (1965)
The following list are singles released on 20th Century Fox.

Atco (1965–1967)
The following list are singles released on Atco.

Jubilee (1968–1971)
The following list are singles released on Jubilee.

Reprise (1971; 1974)
The following list are singles released on Reprise.

Epic (1981)
The following list are singles released on Epic.

Allegiance (1983)

Nightmare (1987–1989)

Tamla Motown UK releases
Including catalogue numbers.
 TML11006 My Baby Just Cares for Me LP
 TML11032 Greatest Hits LP
 STMS5057 Sings My Guy LP
 STMS5093 Greatest Hits LP
 TMG820 "My Guy" / "You Lost the Sweetest Boy" / "Two Lovers" single
 TME2007 Mary Wells EP

References

External links

Rhythm and blues discographies
Discographies of American artists
Pop music discographies
Soul music discographies